The Care Provider Alliance (CPA) is an informal alliance of the ten main national associations which represent independent and voluntary adult social care providers in England.  Nadra Ahmed is the chair of the alliance.

The members are:
Associated Retirement Community Operators (ARCO)
Association for Real Change(ARC)
Association of Mental Health Providers
Care England
National Care Association (NCA)
National Care Forum (NCF)
Registered Nursing Home Association (RNHA)
Shared Lives Plus
United Kingdom Home Care Association
Voluntary Organisations Disability Group

It acts as a collective voice, and as a pressure group and lobbyist for the sector.  It has been very involved with initiatives developed under the Better Care Fund and has produced various resources for its members.

In 2015 it formed an alliance with the Association of Directors of Adult Social Services, the Care and Support Alliance, and the NHS Confederation all of whose members are affected by the pressures on social care. The alliance is attempting to influence the result of the 2015 Comprehensive Spending Review.  It warns that the sector is facing “a deepening crisis”.  The campaign has attracted support from some local authorities.

References

External links
Care Provider Alliance website

Social care in the United Kingdom
Medical and health organisations based in the United Kingdom